Jezebel’s Kiss is a 1990 American erotic thriller film directed by Harvey Keith and starring Katherine Barrese, Malcolm McDowell, Meredith Baxter, Meg Foster, Everett McGill.

Plot
A young, beautiful woman arrives in a small town to take revenge for the egregious injustice that was inflicted on her family many years ago. To fulfil her plans, she resorts to seduction and manipulation.

Cast
Katherine Barrese as Jezebel
Sasha Barrese as Young Jezebel (as Alexandra Barrese)
Malcolm McDowell as Benjamin J. Faberson
Meredith Baxter as Virginia De Leo
Meg Foster as Amanda Faberson
Everett McGill as Sheriff Dan Riley
Brent David Fraser as Hunt Faberman
Bert Remsen as Doctor Samuel Whatley
Elizabeth Ruscio as Margie

References

External links
 
 
 

1990 films
American erotic thriller films
1990s English-language films
1990s American films